Vassenden is a village in Sunnfjord Municipality in Vestland county, Norway.

Vassenden Church was built in 2002 to serve the people of Vassenden and the surrounding areas.

References

Sunnfjord
Villages in Vestland